Mohammed Adel Barakat (born March 3, 1967) is an American field hockey player. He competed in the men's tournament at the 1984 Summer Olympics.

Los Angeles-born Palestinian Olympic runner Hanna Barakat is Jennifer Stoller's and his daughter. Hanna Barakat's brother Adam has played American football for Bucknell University.

References

External links
 
 

1967 births
Living people
American male field hockey players
Olympic field hockey players of the United States
Field hockey players at the 1984 Summer Olympics
People from Sangrur